The Essential Pansy Division is a compilation album by American queercore band Pansy Division, released on January 24, 2006 by Alternative Tentacles.

Personally selected by the band themselves, The Essential Pansy Division is a collection of Pansy Division's most notable and popular songs, spanning from their 1992 debut single Fem in a Black Leather Jacket to their 2003 studio album Total Entertainment!. The CD album is accompanied by a DVD featuring live footage and the band's music videos, as well as extensive liner notes written by singer-songwriter Jon Ginoli, detailing each track.

Reception
The Essential Pansy Division received unanimously positive acclaim from the music press. Allmusic, rating it with a score of 4.5 out of 5 stars, wrote that the compilation "[showcases] exactly what they're good at -- playing tight, catchy pop-punk songs with clever lyrics that ooze with upfront and hilarious sexual references", summarizing it as a perfect "starter kit for those just discovering these witty and energetic punks". PopMatters wrote "Pansy Division at their best have always combined elements of '60s pop and '70s punk into an irresistible cocktail that was outrageous, touching, funny and real in roughly equally measures. Despite its many omissions, all of these elements are displayed richly on The Essential Pansy Division, ultimately rating the album with 9 out of 10 stars. Pitchfork gave the album a score of 7.8 out of 10, praising the band's material as "fun, three-chord punk at its best" and "fine examples of how fun pop-punk can be".

Track listing

CD

DVD
Music video
"Hippy Dude" – 3:23
"Homo Christmas" – 2:29
"Touch My Joe Camel" – 2:48
"I Really Wanted You" – 2:47
"Manada" – 2:10
"Bad Boyfriend" – 2:38
"Vicious Beauty" – 5:03

Live in Chicago – November 18, 1994
"Fem In A Black Leather Jacket (Live)" – 1:58
"The Cocksucker Club (Live)" – 2:12
"Fuck Buddy (Live)" – 2:14
"Versatile (Live)" – 2:43

Live on Italian television – November 26, 1998
"Bad Boyfriend (Live)" – 2:43
"interview" – 3:29
"You're Gonna Need Your Friends (Live)" – 3:00
"The Best Revenge (Live)" – 4:58

References

Pansy Division albums
2006 compilation albums
2006 video albums
Music video compilation albums
Alternative Tentacles compilation albums
Alternative Tentacles video albums